Mykola Dmytrovych Leontovych (23 January 1921; ; also Leontovich) was a Ukrainian composer, conductor, ethnomusicologist and teacher. His music was inspired by the Ukrainian composer Mykola Lysenko and the Ukrainian National Music School. Leontovych specialised in a cappella choral music, ranging from original compositions, to church music, to elaborate arrangements of folk music.

Leontovych was born and raised in the Podolia province of the Russian Empire (now in Ukraine). He was educated as a priest in the Kamianets-Podilskyi Theological Seminary and later furthered his musical education at the Saint Petersburg Court Capella, and by means of private lessons with Boleslav Yavorsky. With the independence of the Ukrainian state in the 1917 revolution, Leontovych moved to Kyiv, where he worked at the Kyiv Conservatory and the Mykola Lysenko Institute of Music and Drama. He composed "Shchedryk" in 1904 (premiered in 1916), now known to the English-speaking world as "Carol of the Bells". He was murdered by a Soviet agent in 1921, and is known as a martyr in the Eastern Orthodox Ukrainian Church, where he is also remembered for his liturgy, the first liturgy composed in the vernacular, specifically in the modern Ukrainian language.

During his lifetime, Leontovych's compositions and arrangements became popular with musicians across the Ukrainian region of the Russian Empire. Performances of his works in western Europe and North America earned him the nickname "the Ukrainian Bach". Apart from "Shchedryk", Leontovych's music is performed primarily in Ukraine and by the Ukrainian diaspora.

Biography

Early life

His father, grandfather, and great grandfather were village priests. Both his mother, Mariya Yosypivna Leontovych, and his father, Dmytro Feofanovych Leontovych, were singers. 

Leontovych received his first musical lessons from his father, who directed a school choir, and was skilled at playing the cello, double bass, harmonium, violin, and guitar. Mykola's other siblings also grew up to have careers in music. His brother Oleksandr was a professional singer, his sister Mariya studied singing in Odesa, his sister Olena studied fortepiano at the Kyiv Conservatory, and his sister Victoriya could play several musical instruments. 

In 1879, Dmytro Leontovych was moved to serve as a priest in the village of . In 1887, Mykola was admitted to a school at Nemyriv. Due to financial problems a year later, his father transferred him to the Sharhorod Spiritual Beginners School, whose pupils received full financial support. At the school, Leontovych mastered singing, and was able to freely read difficult passages from religious choral texts.

Theological seminary

His younger brother Oleksandr was enrolled as well, graduating after his older brother.

During his studies there, Leontovych continued to advance his skills on the violin and learnt to play other instruments, including the flute and the harmonium. He participated in the seminary's choir, and when an orchestra was formed during his third year of study, Leontovych joined, Leontovych studied music theory under Y. Bogdanov and started writing choral arrangements, including " ("Oh, from the stony mountain"), " ("Oh, I’ll go to a forest for firewood"), and,  ("A mother has one daughter").

Leontovych conducted the seminary's orchestra and choir. Without his seminary teachers knowing, he attended the opera in Kamianets-Podilskyi. One of the last performances conducted by Leontovych was a concert on 26 May, 1899, when his friends wrote on a photograph: "To the future glorious composer". After graduating from the seminary in 1899, he broke the family tradition by becoming a school teacher, instead of a priest.

Early musical career and marriage
Later, when recalling his time at the school, he wrote: "I cannot complain that the students and villagers treated me unfavourably; due to my inexperience and youth, I was not a good school teacher. Certainly, my mistakes and errors in general educational activities were compensated to some extent by my musical teaching." He would later write a book about this as a professor at the Kyiv Conservatory, titled  (How I Organised an Orchestra in a Village School). 

On 4 March, 1901, after disagreements arose with the school's administration, Leontovych got a new job teaching church music and calligraphy at the Theological College in Tyvriv. Besides working with the college choir, he organised the college's amateur orchestra. He included arrangements of folk songs among the usual religious works sung in theological schools. These included arrangements by Lysenko, his own choral arrangements of folk songs, and entirely original works. One such work was based on a poem by Taras Shevchenko, Zore moya vechirnyaya (Oh My Evening Star). He organized a choir and a small orchestra at the school, which performed some of his works, as well as others by Russian and European composers. Whilst working at the school, he began to collect songs from Polissia. The first set was  not published, but The Second Collection of Songs from Polissia was published in Kyiv in 1903. Leontovych was however dissatisfied with it, and bought back all 300 copies, commenting as a joke, "Let me go to the Dnipro."

Leontovych met a Volhynian girl named Claudia Feropontovna Zholtkevych, whom he married on 22 March 1902. The young couple's first daughter, Halyna, was born in 1903. They later had a second daughter named Yevheniya. 

Financial hardships prompted Leontovych to accept an offer to move to Vinnytsia to instruct at the Church-Educators' College. Again, he organised a choir and, later, a concert band, with which he performed both secular and spiritual music.

During 1903/04, Leontovych attended lectures held at the St. Petersburg Court Capella. He studied music theory, harmony, and polyphony, and choral performance. On 22 April 1904, he earnt his credentials as a choirmaster of church choruses. In the autumn of 1904, M. Leontovych began working as a singing teacher in Grishino (now Pokrovsk, Ukraine), a railway town in the Donetsk region. Leontovych organised a choir of workers, who sang arrangements of Ukrainian, Jewish, Armenian, Russian, and Polish folk songs. Leontovych's activity caused a deterioration in his relationship with the authorities, and in the spring of 1908, he was forced to move back to Tulchyn.

Tulchyn period 

Leontovych moved to Tulchyn in 1907, a move that marked the beginning of a prolific period of composing. There, he taught vocal and instrumental music at the Tulchyn Eparchy Women's College to the daughters of village priests. He developed a lasting friendship with the composer Kyrylo Stetsenko, who went on to influence his musical style. Stetsenko praised his friend's compositions, saying, "Leontovych is a famous music expert from Podolia. He recorded many folk songs... These songs are harmonised for mixed choir. These harmonisations have revealed the author to be a great expert of both choral singing and theoretical studies". Leontovych's choir performed works by Russian composers Mikhail Glinka, Alexey Verstovsky, and Pyotr Ilyich Tchaikovsky, as well as music by Stetsenko, Lysenko, and the Ukrainian composer Petro Nishchynsky.

From 1909, Leontovych studied under the musicologist Boleslav Yavorsky, whom he was to visit in Moscow and Kyiv over the next 12 years. He became involved with the theatrical music scene in Tulchyn, and took charge of the local branch of the Prosvita, a Ukrainian society dedicated to preserving and developing its culture and education.

Leontovych wrote choral arrangements of Ukrainian folk songs, including   (The Roosters are Singing) In 1914, Stetsenko convinced Leontovych to have his music performed by the student choir of the Kyiv University under the leadership of Alexander Koshetz. In December 1916, the performance of his arrangement of "Shchedryk" brought Leontovych great success amongst Kyiv's music lovers.

Career in Kyiv
During the October Revolution and the establishment of the Ukrainian People's Republic in 1918, Leontovych relocated without his family to Kyiv, where he was active as both a conductor and composer. Several of his pieces gained popularity among professional and amateurs groups alike, who added them to their repertoire. At one of the concerts, the "Legend" of Mykola Voronoi in Leontovych's arrangement was a great success. After the arrival of the Bolsheviks, Leontovych worked in the music committee of the People's Commissariat of Education, and taught at the Music and Drama Institute, and, together with the composer and conductor Hryhoriy Veryovka, was employed to produce preschool education courses, and organise choir groups.

During this period, he taught choral conducting at the Kyiv Conservatory, and also taught at the Mykola Lysenko Institute of Music and Drama. He participated in the founding of the Ukrainian Republic Capella of which he was the commissioner. When Kyiv was captured by the White Army on 31 August 1919, the authorities began to persecute the city's Ukrainian intelligentsia. To avoid being arrested, Leontovych was forced to flee to Tulchyn.

Death 
Upon his return to Tulchyn with his family, Leontovych started the city's first music school, since the college where he had worked was closed down by the Bolsheviks, and began to work on an opera,  ("The Mermaid's Easter"), based on the fairy tale by Borys Hrinchenko.

During the night of 22/23 January 1921, Leontovych was murdered by a chekist (Soviet state security agent) Afanasy Grishchenko. Leontovych was staying at the home of his parents, whom he was visiting for the Eastern Orthodox Feast of the Nativity. The undercover chekist had asked to stay the night at the house, and shared a room with Leontovych. At 7.30 in the morning he shot the composer, and robbed the family. By the time a doctor had arrived, Leontovych had died of blood loss.

Music

Works

Mykola Leontovych specialised in a cappella choral music, and composed over 150 choral compositions, generally inspired by Ukrainian folk songs. These range from artistic arrangements of folk songs, religious works (including his liturgy), cantatas, and compositions set to the words of Ukrainian poets. His most famous works are the choral miniatures "Schedryk" and "Dudaryk". His choral compositions feature rich harmony, vocal polyphony, and imitation. His earlier choral arrangements of folk songs were primarily strophic arrangements of the melody. As the composer gained more experience, the structure of his choral compositions and arrangements of folk songs became strongly connected with the text.

As a person with a professional theological education, Leontovych kept up with the movement of the establishment and recognition of the Ukrainian Autocephalous Orthodox Church, which was reestablished in 1918. The composer's output during this period became rich in new sacred music, following the examples of Stetsenko (a close friend of Leontovych's, also an orthodox priest and composer) and Koshetz. A milestone in the development of Ukrainian spiritual music was the composition of his liturgy, which was first performed in the St. Nicholas Military Cathedral at the Kyiv, Pechersk on 22 May 1919.

Mykola Leontovych was highly critical of himself. According to his first biographer Oles' Chapkivskyi, a contemporary of the composer, Leontovych would sometimes work on one choral setting without letting anyone else see it for up to four years. Leontovych compiled his "First collection of songs from Polissia", which remained unpublished  His "The Second Collection of Songs from Polissia" (Kyiv, 1903) was dedicated to Lysenko. Leontovych was dissatisfied with the work, bought up all 300 published copies, and had them destroyed.

Leontovych commenced work on an opera  (On the Water Nymph's Easter), based on Ukrainian myths and the works of the Ukrainian author Borys Hrinchenko. By the end of 1920, he had finished the first of three acts, but he was murdered before he could complete the opera. Attempts to complete and edit the opera were made by Ukrainian composer Mykhailo Verykivsky. The Ukrainian composer Myroslav Skoryk and the poet Diodor Bobyr collaborated to turn the unfinished opera into a one-act operetta, which premiered in 1977 at the Kyiv State Opera and Ballet Theatre, 100 years after Leontovych's birth. The North American premiere was held in Toronto on 11 April 2003.

Lysenko was one of Leontovych's largest influences. Leontovych, who had admired his music since his student days, would perform it in concerts wherever he worked.

"Shchedryk"

Mykola Leontovych's song "Shchedryk" is his most well-known piece. "Shchedryk" is generally said to have been first performed on 25 December 1916, at St. Volodymyr's Kyiv University. However, it was first performed on 29 December 1916 in the Kyiv Merchants' Assembly Hall, now part of the National Philharmonic of Ukraine. 

The Ukrainian National Choir's performance of "Shchedryk" during a tour of Europe in 1920/21. caused the song to become popular worldwide. The first recording was made in New York in October 1922 by Brunswick Records.

"Carol of the Bells"
"Shchedryk" was performed during a concert in Carnegie Hall, where the American composer and conductor Peter J Wilhousky heard it. In 1936, he published the song to Leontovich's music as a Christmas carol, with his own text in English that bears no resemblance to the original Ukrainian words of the song. The English version, known as "Carol of the Bells", has been arranged over 150 times since 2004.

The carol is one of the 25 most frequently performed Christmas songs of the 20th century. As listed by the American Society of Composers, Authors and Publishers (ASCAP), it ranked number 15.

Reception and popularity 
Leontovych's best critic was his friend, and fellow priest and composer Stetsenko, who described him as "a great expert of both choral singing and theoretical studies". He convinced Leontovych to publish his music and have it performed by Kyiv University students.

"Shchedryk"'s success led to Leontovych becoming popular in Kyiv with music specialists and fans of choral music alike. At the Kyiv Conservatory, Yavorsky reacted positively to his new works. During a concert, Leontovych's Lehenda, set to lyrics by the Ukrainian poet Mykola Voronyi, gained great popularity. After reviewing the composer's Second Compilation of Songs from Podolia, Lysenko wrote:

The increase in popularity of Leontovych's music was aided by the head of the Ukrainian National Republic, Symon Petliura, who created and sponsored two choirs to promote awareness of the culture of Ukraine. Stetsenko's choir toured across Ukraine, while the Koshetz's Ukrainian Republic Capella toured Europe and the Americas. Performances by the Ukrainian Republic Capella made Leontovych known throughout the western world—in France, Leontovych earned the nickname, "Ukrainian Bach". On 5 October 1921, the Capella performed "Shchedryk" in the Carnegie Hall in New York. 

Leontovych's music is currently performed mostly in Ukraine, and few recordings are dedicated exclusively to him. 

The Ukrainian diaspora remember him and perform his works. The Canadian Oleksandr Koshyts Choir, based in Winnipeg, performs music by Leontovych and other Ukrainian composers, and has made a recording of his works.

Commemoration 

On 1 February 1921, nine days after Leontovych's death, artists, academics, and students of the Mykola Lysenko Institute of Music and Drama in Kyiv gathered to commemorate him. They established the Committee for the Memory of Mykola Leontovych, which later became the Leontovych Music Society, and which promoted Ukrainian music until 1928.

A number of musical groups are named in honour of the composer. The Leontovych Bandurist Capella was a male choir whose members accompanied themselves using a Ukrainian bandura. The choir was established in a displaced persons camps in Germany in 1946, and continued until 1949. The  is named after him. The museum was rebuilt after the premises became dilapidated, and reopened in 2016. In 2018, a statue of the composer was unveiled in Pokrovsk.

In 2002, to celebrate the 125th anniversary of the composer's birth, Kamianets-Podilskyi held an all-Ukrainian scientific conference entitled "Mykola Leontovych and Modern Education and Science," with guests from the Ukrainian ministry of education and science, the Ukrainian composers' Union, and many local authorities. During this event, the city held a ceremonial opening of a memorial plaque to the composer, placed next to the old building formerly used by the Podollia Theological Seminary.

References

Sources
 
 
 
 
  (link to  HTML version of the file).
 
  (English text version)

Further reading

External links

 
 

1877 births
1921 deaths
19th-century classical composers
19th-century conductors (music)
20th-century classical composers
20th-century conductors (music)
Classical composers of church music
Academic staff of Kyiv Conservatory
Male classical composers
Male conductors (music)
People from Bratslavsky Uyezd
People from Vinnytsia Oblast
People murdered in Ukraine
Ukrainian classical composers
Ukrainian conductors (music)